Conneaut Township is the name of some places in the U.S. state of Pennsylvania:
Conneaut Township, Crawford County, Pennsylvania
Conneaut Township, Erie County, Pennsylvania

Pennsylvania township disambiguation pages